Old Main is an academic building on the campus of Geneva College in Beaver Falls, Pennsylvania, United States.  The structure was also the first building constructed on the campus, after the college left its original location in Northwood, Ohio.

History 
Old Main was constructed in 1880 by the local Pittsburgh architect, James P. Bailey who would later design the Butler County Courthouse in Butler, Pennsylvania, and the First Presbyterian Church in Beaver, Pennsylvania.

The building opened its doors in the fall of 1881 as the first structure to be built on the new campus.  Today, Old Main serves as a classroom building, and also houses the college's faculty, and administration offices.

School buildings completed in 1881
Buildings and structures in Beaver County, Pennsylvania
Geneva College
Geneva College
1881 establishments in Pennsylvania
Beaver Falls, Pennsylvania